Synaptidae is a family of sea cucumbers that have no tube feet, tentacle ampullae, retractor muscles, respiratory trees, or cuvierian tubules.  They also lack radial canals of the water-vascular system, with only the circumoral ring present.

Synaptids have elongated bodies, and their size varies significantly from small to quite large. Synapta maculata grows to two metres in length. They are quite active, moving by means of waves of peristaltic contractions. Their tegument is somewhat sticky because of the anchor-like spicules that project through the skin.

Genera
According to World Register of Marine Species: 
 Anapta Semper, 1867 -- 3 species
 Dactylapta Clark, 1908 -- 1 species
 †Eoleptosynapta Reich in Reich & Ansorge, 2014 -- 1 species
 †Eorynkatorpa Reich in Reich & Ansorge, 2014 -- 1 species
 Epitomapta Heding, 1928 -- 3 species
 Euapta Östergren, 1898 -- 4 species
 Eupatinapta Heding, 1928 -- 2 species
 Labidoplax Östergren, 1898 -- 5 species
 Leptosynapta Verrill, 1867 -- 33 species
 Oestergrenia Heding, 1931 -- 9 species
 Opheodesoma Fisher, 1907 -- 10 species
 Patinapta Heding, 1928 -- 6 species
 Polyplectana Clark, 1908 -- 12 species
 Protankyra Östergren, 1898 -- 37 species
 Rhabdomolgus Keferstein, 1862 -- 1 species
 Rynkatorpa Rowe & Pawson, 1967 -- 13 species
 Synapta Eschscholtz, 1829 -- 2 species
 Synaptula Örstedt, 1849 -- 29 species

Gallery

References

Echinoderm families